The Journal of Correctional Health Care is a quarterly peer-reviewed healthcare journal that publishes papers four times a year in the field of health care in correctional settings. The editor-in-chief is John R. Miles. It was established 1994 and is currently published by SAGE Publications in association with the National Commission on Correctional Health Care.

Abstracting and indexing 
The Journal of Correctional Health Care is abstracted and indexed in:
 CINAHL
 Criminal Justice Abstracts
 Science Citation Index
 MEDLINE
 PsycINFO
 SafetyLit

External links 
 

SAGE Publishing academic journals
English-language journals
Healthcare journals
Quarterly journals
Publications established in 1994